The Dharasu Power Station is a run-of-the-river hydroelectric power station on the Bhagirathi River located at Dharasu in Uttarkashi district, Uttarakhand, India. The power station was commissioned in 2008 and has a 304 MW capacity.

Background
The power station is stage two of the Maneri Bhali Hydroelectric Project which was planned in the 1960s. In 1979, construction on stage two began. Dharasu, the second stage was halted in 1990 due to funding issues and was not restarted until 2002. The power station was eventually completed and commissioned by 2008.

Design
The water powers four 76 MW Francis turbine-generators before being discharged back into the river.

See also

List of power stations in India

References

Energy infrastructure completed in 2008
Hydroelectric power stations in Uttarakhand
Run-of-the-river power stations
Uttarkashi district
2008 establishments in Uttarakhand